A Widow's Walk is a raised platform on the roof of a house used for viewing the arrival of ships.

Widow's walk may also refer to:
Widow's Walk, 1984 novel by Andrew Coburn
Widow's Walk (novel), 2002 novel by Robert B. Parker
Widow's Walk (1987 film), directed by Pierre Granier-Deferre
Widow's Walk (2017 film), directed by Alexandra Boyd
"Widow's Walk", a song by Suzanne Vega from her 2001 album Songs in Red and Gray
Widow's Walk, the first expansion (2016) to the board game Betrayal at House on the Hill